Martin J. Peters was an American football and basketball player and coach and college athletic administrator. He was drafted in the seventh round of the 1936 NFL Draft. He served two stints as the head football coach at St. Benedict's College—now known as Benedictine College—in Atchison, Kansas, from 1937 to 1941 and again from 1946 to 1947, compiling a record of 29–24–5. Peters was also the head basketball coach at St. Benedict's, tallying a mark of 78–73.

Peters was a graduate of the University of Notre Dame, where he played on the football and basketball teams. He began his coaching career at St. Teresa High School in Decatur, Illinois.

Peters served in the United States Navy during World War II and was discharged as a lieutenant commander. He resigned from his post at St. Benedict's in May 1948 to take a job with a beverage company in Atchison.

Head coaching record

College football

See also
 List of college football head coaches with non-consecutive tenure

References

Year of birth missing
Year of death missing
1910s births
American football ends
Forwards (basketball)
Benedictine Ravens athletic directors
Benedictine Ravens football coaches
Benedictine Ravens men's basketball coaches
Notre Dame Fighting Irish football players
Notre Dame Fighting Irish men's basketball players
High school basketball coaches in Illinois
High school football coaches in Illinois
United States Navy personnel of World War II
United States Navy officers
Sportspeople from Decatur, Illinois
Sportspeople from Peoria, Illinois
Coaches of American football from Illinois
Players of American football from Illinois
Basketball coaches from Illinois
Basketball players from Illinois